Szu-yung David Wu is a Taiwanese-American educator who is the President of Baruch College of the City University of New York since 2020. He is the first Asian-American appointed to this position at a CUNY college. Previously he held the position of Provost and Executive Vice President of George Mason University.

Education 
Wu received his BS from Tunghai University and his MS and PhD from Pennsylvania State University, both in industrial engineering.

Career 
Wu served as Dean of the Rossin College of Engineering and Applied Science and held the Lee Iacocca endowed chair at Lehigh University, where the S. David Wu Endowed Scholarship was created in his honor in 2014. He was also a visiting professor at the University of Pennsylvania and Hong Kong University of Science and Technology.    

Wu has served on both national and international boards including the National Science Foundation and the Science Foundation of Ireland. He is a board member emeritus of the Thayer School of Engineering at Dartmouth College.

References

Living people
George Mason University faculty
Nationality missing
Year of birth missing (living people)
Place of birth missing (living people)
American academic administrators
Lehigh University faculty
Penn State College of Engineering alumni
Tunghai University alumni
Presidents of Baruch College